Esbon Township is a township in Jewell County, Kansas, USA.  As of the 2000 census, its population was 222.

Geography
Esbon Township covers an area of 35.84 square miles (92.83 square kilometers); of this, 0.03 square miles (0.08 square kilometers) or 0.09 percent is water.

Cities and towns
 Esbon

Adjacent townships
 White Mound Township (north)
 Burr Oak Township (northeast)
 Limestone Township (east)
 Ionia Township (southeast)
 Odessa Township (south)
 Webster Township, Smith County (southwest)
 Oak Township, Smith County (west)
 White Rock Township, Smith County (northwest)

Cemeteries
The township contains three cemeteries: Esbon, Prairie Home and Saint Elizabeth.

Major highways
 U.S. Route 36

References
 U.S. Board on Geographic Names (GNIS)
 United States Census Bureau cartographic boundary files

External links
 US-Counties.com
 City-Data.com

Townships in Jewell County, Kansas
Townships in Kansas